Now Summer 2006 is a compilation CD released by EMI Music Australia in late 2005. Like most Australian summer compilations, it is released in December and is meant to carry on throughout January and February (the three months of summer). Now Summer 2006 is the 11th CD in the Australian Now! series.

Track listing
 The Veronicas – "4ever" (3:30)
 Robbie Williams – "Tripping" (4:36)
 Missy Elliott – "Teary Eyed" (3:32)
 Ricki-Lee – "Sunshine" (3:02)
 Simple Plan – "Crazy" (3:38)
 Daniel Powter – "Free Loop (One Night Stand)" (3:48)
 Paul Mac featuring Peta Morris – "Sunshine Eyes" (3:31)
 T-Funk featuring Inaya Day – "The Glamorous Life" (T-Funk Radio Edit) (3:28)
 Sean Paul – "We Be Burnin'" (3:35)
 Faith Evans – "Mesmerized" (Freemasons Radio Edit) (3:23)
 Savage featuring Akon – "Moonshine" (3:35)
 End of Fashion – "Lock Up Your Daughters" (2:54)
 Kisschasy – "Face Without a Name" (2:57)
 The Used – "I Caught Fire" (3:25)
 Faker – "Hurricane" (3:21)
 Coldplay – "Fix You" (4:35)
 Liberty X – "Song 4 Lovers" (4:17)
 DJ Peril featuring Suburban Intellect – "It's About to Blow" (3:57)
 Andy J – "Tilt My Hat (At the Sun)" (2:55)
 Les Rythmes Digitales – "Jacques Your Body (Make Me Sweat)" (2:44)
 Crazy Frog – "Popcorn" (2:49)

External links
 NOW Summer 2006 @ Australian Charts

2005 compilation albums
EMI Records compilation albums
Warner Records compilation albums
Now That's What I Call Music! albums (Australian series)